Useche is a surname. Notable people with the surname include:

Andrés Useche (born 1977), Colombian American writer, film director, graphic artist, singer-songwriter, and activist
Delmán Useche (born 1950), Venezuelan footballer
Marco Antonio Rivera Useche (1895–1990), Venezuelan musician and composer